Richard Allen Sowells (born October 27, 1948) is a former professional American football cornerback in the  National Football League. He played seven seasons for the New York Jets and the Houston Oilers.

1948 births
Living people
People from Prairie View, Texas
Players of American football from Texas
Sportspeople from the Houston metropolitan area
American football cornerbacks
Alcorn State Braves football players
New York Jets players
Houston Oilers players